Cromyatractus elegans is a species of radiolarian in the order Spumellaria. The holotype is on a slide n°1066 kept at the Marine Dept., Zoological Institute, Acad. of Sc., St Petersburg, Russia. The type locality is the North Western Pacific Ocean and it was found during an expedition of Vityaz in 1961.

References 

 Petrushevskaya, M. G. (1969b). Radiolyarii Spumellaria i Nassellaria v donnykh osadkakh kak indikatory gydrologycheskikh uslovii (Spumellarian and Nassellarian radiolarians in bottom sediments as indicators of hydrological conditions). Osnovnye Problemy micropaleontologii i organogennovo osadkonakopleniya v okeanakh i moryakh (Basic problems of micropaleontology and the accumulation of organogenic sediments in oceans and seas). A. P. Jouse. Moscow, USSR, Izdatelstvo Nauka, Akademiya Nauk SSSR, Okeanografitcheskaya Komissiya: 127-151.

External links 

 Cromyatractus elegans at geologie.mnhn.fr

Polycystines
Species described in 1969